Alfred Riley (7 December 1889–1958) was an English footballer who played in the Football League for Wolverhampton Wanderers. He played in the 1921 FA Cup Final as Wolves lost 1–0 to Tottenham Hotspur.

References

1889 births
1958 deaths
English footballers
Association football midfielders
English Football League players
Telford United F.C. players
Stafford Rangers F.C. players
Wolverhampton Wanderers F.C. players
FA Cup Final players